Aquarium ferry wharf (also known as Darling Harbour Aquarium ferry wharf) is a commuter wharf that serves the Darling Harbour precinct as well as the Sea Life Sydney Aquarium, which is right next to the wharf. The wharf, built in the 1980s as part of an initiative to deliver transport services to the then-newly redeveloped Darling Harbour, was originally part of the Sydney Ferries network. The wharf served as the terminus of Darling Harbour ferry services, until the wharf was decommissioned by Sydney Ferries in October 2010, when services to the wharf were rerouted to King Street Wharf 3 instead. My Fast Ferry currently handles services to the wharf, which acts as a terminus for their Manly - Darling Harbour Harbour loop service.

History

As part of the timetable changes of 10 October 2010, all Sydney Ferries services were moved to King Street Wharf 3 a few minutes' walk away.

Summary
The wharf itself is situated directly outside the Sea Life Sydney Aquarium, and is immediately nearby the historic Pier 26. Entrance to the wharf is via a ramp that goes directly to the dock itself. Passengers who are waiting to board a ferry turn right at the end of the ramp and wait on the platform. Passengers who depart from a docked ferry can directly exit through the ramp, bypassing the platform altogether. The former ticket machine used by Sydney Ferries has since been converted to an emergency help point, though, tickets are still sold at the pier. They are sold by a ticket seller who goes behind a stand, situated in front of the former ticket machine, whenever a ferry docks.

Services

Gallery

References

External links

Darling Harbour, Aquarium Wharf at Transport for New South Wales (Archived 11 June 2019)
Sydney Harbour Eco Hopper website

Ferry wharves in Sydney
Darling Harbour